Rob Carter (born 1949) is an American professor of typography and graphic design at Virginia Commonwealth University.

Personal information
Rob Carter was born in 1949 in Salt Lake City, Utah, USA. He lives and works in Richmond, Virginia, USA.

Residencies and awards
Carter has received numerous awards for his work from organizations such as the American Institute of Graphic Arts, New York Type Directors Club, Society of Typographic Arts, Creativity, and Print regional annual.

Bibliography

 American Typography Today, Rob Carter (1989)
 Working with Type five-volume series 
 Typographic Specimens: The Great Typefaces, Philip B. Meggs, Rob Carter (1993)
 Meggs: making graphic design history, Philip B. Meggs, Rob Carter, Libby Phillips Meggs, Sandy Wheeler (2007)
 Digital Colour and Type, Typographic Design: Form And Communication, Rob Carter, Philip B. Meggs, Ben Day, Sandra Maxa, Mark Sanders (2014).

References

External links
Virginia Commonwealth University faculty

Living people
American graphic designers
American typographers and type designers
Virginia Commonwealth University faculty
1949 births